Robert Hardy Cleland (born April 26, 1947) is a senior United States district judge of the United States District Court for the Eastern District of Michigan.

Education and career

Born in St. Clair, Michigan, Cleland received a Bachelor of Arts degree from Michigan State University in 1969 and a Juris Doctor from the University of North Carolina School of Law in 1972. He was in private practice in Port Huron, Michigan from 1972 to 1975. He was a county assistant prosecuting attorney of Port Huron from 1972 to 1980, serving as Chief Assistant from 1977 to 1980. He was elected Prosecuting Attorney of Saint Clair County, Michigan in 1980, and was re-elected twice, serving in that position from 1981 to 1990.

Federal judicial service

On February 20, 1990, Cleland was nominated by President George H. W. Bush to a seat on the United States District Court for the Eastern District of Michigan vacated by James Paul Churchill. Cleland was confirmed by the United States Senate on June 18, 1990, and received his commission on June 19, 1990. He took senior status on February 28, 2013.

References

Sources
 

1947 births
Living people
Michigan State University alumni
Judges of the United States District Court for the Eastern District of Michigan
United States district court judges appointed by George H. W. Bush
20th-century American judges
People from St. Clair, Michigan
21st-century American judges